Little Friends: Dogs & Cats is a pet simulation video game developed by Imagineer exclusively for the Nintendo Switch. The game was released on December 6, 2018, in Japan, May 27, 2019 in North America and May 28, 2019, in Europe and Australia. The game was announced in September 2018 in an issue of Famitsu magazine.

Gameplay 
The game offers a variety of puppies and kittens which the players can interact with. Activities include playing, feeding, petting, and dressing up the pets to develop a bond with them. Each pet contains different personality traits, which determines their likes and dislikes for certain food and activities. Playing with the pet using their favorite toys allows the player to unlock new toys and activities, such as a flying disc tournament. Similarly, a wide variety of accessories can be unlocked for dressing up the pets and taking screenshots.

Reception 
Little Friends received "mixed or average" reviews from critics according to Metacritic with a current Metascore of 53/100.

Nintendo Life gave Little Friends a 5/10, saying that the game "invites comparisons with the Nintendogs series with its structure and overall presentation." and concluded that "once you've enjoyed petting your fill of digital 'good bois', you'll be left marveling at how little there is to do even compared to that most lightweight (though fondly remembered) of Nintendo offerings." Nintendo World Report gave Little Friends a 5/10, praising the game for delivering "on its promises" and for having "many outfits to buy and customize", but criticized the game's "failure to do more to capture my attention". Switch Player gave Little Friends a 2.5/5, calling it a "shallow" experience, but said it could "work as an idle game if you're after this kind of experience."

Famitsu gave Little Friends a 29/40, with a score of 8/7/7/7 from the four reviewers.

References 

2018 video games
Nintendo Switch games
Nintendo Switch-only games
Virtual pet video games
Video games developed in Japan
Casual games
Imagineer games
Arc System Works games
Single-player video games